Stephen Isaiah Vladeck (born September 26, 1979) is the Charles Alan Wright Chair in Federal Courts at the University of Texas School of Law, where he specializes in national security law, especially with relation  to  the prosecution of war crimes. Vladeck has commented on the legality of the United States' use of extrajudicial detention and  torture, and is a regular contributor to CNN.

Early life and education
Vladeck, the son of Fredda Wellin Vladeck and Bruce C. Vladeck (administrator of the Health Care Financing Administration from 1993 to 1997, now the Centers for Medicare and Medicaid Services), was born and raised in New York City before moving to Silver Spring, Maryland with his family when his father became administrator of the Health Care Financing Administration in 1993. He is the grandson of Judith Vladeck, a labor lawyer who won major sex and age discrimination cases. He is the nephew of Georgetown University Law Center professor, and former director of the Bureau of Consumer Protection of the Federal Trade Commission David Vladeck.

Vladeck was a two-sport athlete at Montgomery Blair High School, and he was active in the athletics department at Amherst College, where he graduated summa cum laude with a double major in mathematics and history. His J.D. degree is from Yale Law School, where he was the executive director of the Yale Law Journal and was the student director of the balancing civil liberties & national security post-9/11 litigation project. He was also awarded the Potter Stewart prize and Harlan Fiske Stone prize.

Career

Vladeck clerked for Marsha Berzon and Rosemary Barkett — judges on the 9th and 11th Circuit Court of Appeals. He worked on the legal team managed by Neal K. Katyal that successfully challenged the constitutionality of George W. Bush's Guantanamo Military Commissions. In 2005 Vladeck joined the law faculty at the University of Miami School of Law in Coral Gables, Florida. In 2007 he joined the faculty at the Washington College of Law at American University. In 2016 he joined the faculty at the University of Texas School of Law. Vladeck is a founding member of Lawfare; an executive editor, prior co-editor-in-chief and contributor at Just Security; and a contributor at PrawfsBlawg.

Personal life

Vladeck married Karen Shafrir in 2011.

Media

Vladeck co-hosts the National Security Law Podcast with fellow University of Texas law professor Robert Chesney. In 2020, Vladeck began hosting a second podcast, In Loco Parent(i)s with his wife, Karen Shafrir-Vladeck. The podcast is “about parenting and lawyering, in that order.” He also publishes a Substack newsletter, titled One First.

Selected publications

Scholarship 
Coauthor with Stephen Dycus, Arthur L. Berney, William C. Banks, & Peter Raven-Hansen  National Security Law, 6th ed. 
Coauthor with Stephen Dycus, William C. Banks, & Peter Raven-Hansen Counter terrorism Law, 3rd ed. 2016

Opinion pieces

References

External links
 Profile at University of Texas School of Law
 National Security Law Podcast
 
 
 

1970s births
American lawyers
American legal scholars
Amherst College alumni
Living people
University of Texas School of Law faculty
Yale Law School alumni